Klang or Kelang, officially Royal City of Klang, is a royal city and former capital of the state of Selangor, Malaysia. It is located within the Klang District. It was the civil capital of Selangor in an earlier era prior to the emergence of Kuala Lumpur and the current capital, Shah Alam. Port Klang, which is located in the Klang District, is the 12th busiest transshipment port and the 12th busiest container port in the world.

The Klang Municipal Council or  exercises jurisdiction for a majority of the Klang District while the Shah Alam City Council exercises some jurisdiction over the east of Klang District, north of Petaling District and the other parts of Selangor State including Shah Alam itself.

As of 2010, the Klang City has a total population of 240,016 (10,445 in the city centre), while the population of Klang District is 842,146, and the population of all towns managed by Klang Municipal Council is 744,062, making it Selangor's second largest city.

History

The royal town of Klang has been a site of human settlement since prehistoric times. Bronze Age drums, axes and other artefacts have been found in the vicinity of the town and within the town itself. A bronze bell dating from the 2nd century BC was found in Klang and is now in the British Museum. Also found in or near Klang are iron tools called "tulang mawas" ("ape bones") and a bronze drum. Commanding the approaches to the tin rich Klang Valley, Klang has always been of key strategic importance. It was mentioned as a dependency of other states as early as the 11th century. Klang was also mentioned in the 14th century literary work Nagarakretagama dated to the Majapahit Empire, and the Klang River was marked and named on the earliest maritime charts of Chinese Admiral Cheng Ho who visited Malacca from 1409 to 1433.

Klang was under the control of the Malacca Sultanate in the 15th century. The celebrated Tun Perak, the Malacca's greatest Bendahara, came from Klang and became its territorial chief. According to the Malay Annals, the people of Klang overthrew the local chief or penghulu and asked the Sultan of Malacca Muzaffar Shah to appoint another, and Tun Perak was then appointed the leader. Klang was known as a producer of tin; according to Manuel Godinho de Erédia, it produced one hundred bares of tin a year when the Portuguese occupied Malacca.  Klang however remained in Malay hands after the fall of Melaka to the Portuguese in 1511, and was controlled by the Sultan of Johor-Riau. In the 17th century, the Bugis began to settle in the coastal region of Selangor including Klang, and the Selangor sultanate was created in the 1766, which then controlled Klang.

In the 19th century the importance of Klang greatly increased by the rapid expansion of tin mining as a result of the increased demand for tin from the West. The desire to control the Klang Valley led directly to the Klang War (also called the Selangor Civil War) of 1867–1874 when Raja Mahdi fought to regain what he considered his birthright as territorial chief against Raja Abdullah. During the Klang War, in 1868, the seat of power was moved to Bandar Temasya, Kuala Langat, and then to Jugra which became the royal capital of Selangor.

Klang however did not lose its importance. In 1874, Selangor accepted a British Resident who would "advise" the Sultan, and Klang became the capital of British colonial administration for Selangor from 1875 until 1880 when the capital city was moved to Kuala Lumpur due to the growth of Kuala Lumpur from tin-mining. Today Klang is no longer State capital or the main seat of the ruler, but it remains the headquarters of the District to which it gives it name.

Until the construction of Port Swettenham (now known as Port Klang) in 1901, Klang remained the chief outlet for Selangor's tin, and its position was enhanced by the completion of the Klang Valley railway to Bukit Kuda in 1886, which was then connected to Klang itself via a rail bridge, the Connaught Bridge, completed in 1890.  In the 1890s its growth was further stimulated by the development of the district into the State' leading producer of coffee, and later rubber.  In 1903, the royal seat was moved back to Klang when it became the official seat of Sultan Sulaiman (Sultan Alauddin Sulaiman Shah).

In May 1890, a local authority, known as Klang Health Board, was established to administer Klang town. The official boundary of Klang was first defined in 1895. The first road bridge over the Klang River connecting the two parts of the town, the Belfield Bridge, was constructed in 1908. In 1926 the health boards of Klang and Port Swettenham were merged, and in 1945 the local authority was renamed Klang Town Board. In 1954, the Town Board became the Klang Town Council after a local election was set up to select its members in accordance with the Local Government Election Ordinance of 1950.  In 1963, the Port Klang Authority was created and it now administers three Port Klang areas: Northport, Southpoint, and West Port.

In 1971, the Klang District Council, which incorporated the nearby townships of Kapar and Meru as well as Port Klang, was formed. After undergoing a further reorganisation according to the Local Government Act of 1976 (Act 171), Klang District Council was upgraded to Klang Municipal Council (KMC) on 1 January 1977. From 1974 to 1977, Klang was the state capital of Selangor before the seat of government shifted to Shah Alam in 1977.

Etymology
Klang may have taken its name from the Klang River which runs through the town. The entire geographical area in the immediate vicinity of the river, which begins at Kuala Lumpur and runs west all the way to Port Klang, is known as the Klang Valley.

One popular theory on the origin of the name is that it is derived from the Mon–Khmer word Klong, which may mean a canal or waterway. Alternatively it has also been argued that it means "warehouses", from the Malay word Kilang –  in the old days, it was full of warehouses (kilang currently means "factory").

Klang was also once known as Pengkalan Batu meaning "stone jetty".

Unlike most other place names in Malaysia, the Chinese name for Klang, is neither a direct transcription nor translation, but likely a transcription of another Malay word Pasang, referring to the rising tides around the Klang Valley.

Districts

Klang is divided into North Klang and South Klang, which are separated by the Klang River. North Klang is divided into three sub-districts which are Kapar (Located at the north of North Klang), Rantau Panjang (situated at the west of North Klang) and Meru (at the east of North Klang).

Klang North used to be the main commercial centre of Klang, but since 2008, more residential and commercial areas as well as government offices are being developed in Klang South. Most major government and private health care facilities are also located at Klang South. Hence, this area tends to be busier and becomes the centre of social and recreational activities after office hours and during the weekends. This is triggered by the rapid growth of new and modern townships such as Bandar Botanic, Bandar Bukit Tinggi, Taman Sentosa Perdana, Taman Sri Andalas, Taman Bayu Perdana, Taman Sentosa, Glenmarie Cove, Kota Bayuemas etc. all located within Klang South.

At the Klang North side, some of the older and established residential areas include Berkeley Garden, Taman Eng Ann, Taman Klang Utama, Bandar Baru Klang and so forth. Newer townships include Bandar Bukit Raja, Aman Perdana and Klang Sentral.

Malaysia's busiest port, Port Klang was previously named Port Swettenham until 1972 when it was renamed Port Klang. Port Klang is located at Klang South.

Economy 
Initially, Bukit Kuda port (located at 12.5 miles away from Klang river mouth) was established as a port that connect to mining areas within Kuala Lumpur. Later, a railway line was built connecting Bukit Kuda with Kuala Lumpur. However, the Bukit Kuda port was found to be unsuitable. Therefore, the town of Klang which is located at three miles nearer to the river mouth than Bukti Kuda, was chosen become the major port. A bridge was constructed across the Klang river and railway was connected to Klang in August 1890. Klang port received huge amount of traffic in the following years, which later the authorities decided to extend the railway line to the mouth of the river where new port named "Port Swettenham" would be constructed in 1901. However, Port Swettenham was plaqued with malaria infections which affected coolies and port staff greatly, causing a delay in unloading cargoes from the ships. Sir Malcom Watson, a district surgeon in Klang solved the malaria problem in 1903 by clearing the forests and undergrowth and construct a drainage system at the same time.

Klang gradually became the main manufacturing centre for Malaya after the end of World War I. The first person who set up a factory in Klang was a millionaire from Singapore named Tan Kah Kee. His factory produced canned pineapples. The setting up of his factory stimulated the pineapple plantations around Klang. After Tan went bankrupt in 1934, Goh Hock Huat, one of the pineapple producers, decided to set up his own pineapple canning factory. More factories opened in Klang due to its proximity to Port Swettenham. In the following years, factories producing rubber products and oil factory producing products from groundnuts were set up with skills and machineries imported from Singapore.
 
The economy of Klang is closely linked with that the greater Klang Valley conurbation which is the most densely populated, urbanised and industrialised region of Malaysia. There is a wide range of industries within the Klang municipality, major industrial areas may be found in Bukit Raja, Kapar, Meru, Taman Klang Utama and Sungai Buloh, Pulau Indah, Teluk Gong and others. Rubber used to be an important part of the economy of the region, but from the 1970s onwards, many rubber plantations have switched to palm oil, and were then converted again for urban development and infrastructure use.

Port Klang forms an important part of the economy of Klang.  It is home to about 95 shipping companies and agents, 300 custom brokers, 25 container storage centres, as well as more than 70 freight and transport companies. It handled almost 50% of Malaysia's sea-borne container trade in 2013. The Port Klang Free Zone was established in 2004 to transform Port Klang into a regional distribution hub as well as a trade and logistics centre.

The port is part of the 21st Century Maritime Silk Road that runs from the Chinese coast to Singapore, towards the southern tip of India to Mombasa, from there through the Red Sea via the Suez Canal to the Mediterranean, there to the Upper Adriatic region to the northern Italian hub of Trieste with its connections to Central Europe and the North Sea.

Politics
Klang encompasses three parliamentary seats held by the Pakatan Harapan coalition. These constituencies are subdivided into state seats.

Demographics

The following are the census figures for the population of Klang.  The 1957 and 1970 figures are for the Klang district and were collected before the reorganisation of Klang and the Bumiputra status being used as a category. The 2010 figures are for MP Klang.  The figure for Klang city is not given as what constitutes Bandar Klang appears to be inconsistent with considerable fluctuation in population figures over the years.

{|class="wikitable sortable" style="text-align:right"
|-
!rowspan="2"|Ethnic Group
!colspan="8"|Population
|-
!colspan="2"|1957
!colspan="2"|1970
!colspan="2"|2010
!colspan="2"|2020
|-
|style="text-align:left" | Malay || 37,003 || 24.68% || 72,734 || 31.13%||  234,293 || 41.18% || ||
|-
|style="text-align:left" | Other Bumiputras || || || || || 9,107 || 1.60% || ||
|- style="background: #eaf3ff"
|style="text-align:left" | Bumiputra total || || || || || 243,400 || 42.78% || 541,913 || 49,76%
|-
|style="text-align:left" | Chinese || 65,454|| 43.65% ||100,524 || 43.02% || 152,582 || 26.83% || 251,530 || 23.01%
|-
|style="text-align:left" | Indian ||44,393 || 29.60% ||59,333 ||25.39% || 121,533 || 21.37% || 189,552 || 17.41%
|-
|style="text-align:left" | Others || 3,105 || 2.07%|| 1,079 || 0.46% || 2,994 || 0.53% || 7,701 || 0.71%
|- style="background: #eaf3ff"
|style="text-align:left" | Malaysian total || ||  || || || 520,509 || 91.53% || 990,696 || 90.98%
|-
|style="text-align:left" | Non-Malaysian || || || || || 98,246 || 8.47% || 98,246 || 9.02%
|- style="background: #c6e2ff"
|style="text-align:left"| Total|| 149,955|| 100.00%|| 233,670 || 100.00%  || 568,707 || 100.00% || 1,088,942 ||100.00%'|}

 Crime 
There are a number of criminal gangs operating in Klang, and gang violence is not uncommon. Among the Chinese community, there are the Ang Bin Hoey triad gangs such as Gang 21 which operates in Kuala Lumpur and the Klang Valley. There are also Gang 24, Gang 36 and others, and their members are often Indians. Due to economic development and changes in the industry, many rubber estates where Indian plantation workers used to live and work were closed, and this is thought to have contributed to a rise of gangsterism amongst the displaced and economically-deprived Indians. It is thought that the Indians originally worked for Chinese gang leaders but they now dominate many of these criminal organisations.

Transportation 
Klang is served by five commuter stations that constitute the  Port Klang Line of the KTM Komuter system, namely Bukit Badak, Kampung Raja Uda, Klang, Teluk Pulai and the Teluk Gadong stations. By November 2023, Klang will also be connected to the RM 9 billion   LRT Shah Alam transit line.

Klang is connected to the rest of the Klang Valley via the Federal Highway, the New Klang Valley Expressway (NKVE), South Klang Valley Expressway (SKVE), the North Klang Straits Bypass (New North Klang Straits Bypass) as well as the KESAS Highway. The West Coast Expressway (WCE) currently under construction will run between Changkat Jering, Perak and Klang-Banting, Selangor. The construction is expected to be fully completed by end-2022

Klang is also served by the RapidKL bus route. Klang Sentral acts as a terminal for long-distance buses and taxis in northern Klang. There is a non-stop hourly bus service everyday from and to KLIA2 to Klang, of which the embarkation point is located at the AEON Bukit Tinggi Shopping Centre. Smart Selangor Bus Programme was established by the Selangor State Government to provide an efficient and high quality free public transportation service to its citizen. This programme was launched in July 2015 starting with 3 local authorities but it was later expanded to all 12 local authorities in 2020 due to overwhelming response from the public. The Selangor Intelligent Transport Systems Application (SITS) enables the Smart Selangor Bus users to plan their journey effectively and intelligently through the bus services available.

The double-decked Kota Bridge was first built in late 1950s as a replacement for the Belfield Bridge. The double-decked bridge now closed to car traffic after a new Kota Bridge was built alongside it in the 1992, although the lower deck is still used by pedestrians, bicycles and motorcycles. A second bridge in Klang, the Musaeddin (Tengku Kelana) Bridge, was built in the 1980s near the Kota Bridge. The RM199 million Klang Third Bridge was opened for traffic in May 2017, complementing the existing two other road bridges in the city that connect Klang North and Klang South.

Infrastructure and developments

 Shopping complexes 

There are several shopping complexes and hypermarkets in Klang, primarily in Klang South, namely:
 ÆON Bukit Tinggi Shopping Centre (Bandar Bukit Tinggi)
 ÆON Bukit Raja Shopping Centre (Bandar Baru Klang)
 ÆON Big Hypermarket (Kapar Road)
 Big Mall (Persiaran Raja Muda Musa) - formerly known as Harbour Place Shopping Mall, now a member of the Tune Group
 Centro Mall (Jalan Batu Tiga Lama)
 Central I-City Shopping Centre - with SOGO store, situated at the border of Klang-Shah Alam 
 Giant Hypermarket (Bandar Bukit Tinggi, Klang Sentral)
 GM Klang Wholesale City (Bandar Botanic) 
 Klang Parade (Meru Road) - with Parkson store
 KSL Esplanade City Mall @ Klang (Bandar Bestari) – planned, and set to be the largest shopping mall in Klang.
 Lotus's Klang (Bandar Bukit Tinggi) - formerly known as Tesco Extra
Mydin Wholesale Emporium @ Plaza MPK (Klang Town)
 NSK Trade City (Taman Sentosa Perdana)

 Private hospitals and medical centres 
 Columbia Asia Hospital, Bandar Bukit Raja
 Hospital Bersalin Razif, Taman Sri Andalas
 JMC Specialist Medical Centre, Lorong Dato Amar
 KO Specialist Center Klang, Jalan Goh Hock Huat
 KPJ Klang Specialist Hospital, Bandar Baru Klang
 Bukit Tinggi Medical Centre, Bandar Bukit Tinggi (formally known as Manipal Hospitals Klang and Arunamari Specialist Medical Centre)
 Metro Maternity Hospital (Hospital Wanita Metro), Jalan Pasar
 Pantai Hospital Klang, Persiaran Raja Muda Musa, Port Klang
 Sentosa Specialist Hospital
 Sri Kota Medical Centre, Jalan Mohet

 Government hospital and health clinics 
Hospital Tengku Ampuan Rahimah (Klang General Hospital), Jalan Langat
 Klinik Kesihatan Anika Klang
 Klinik Kesihatan Bandar Botanic 
 Klinik Kesihatan Bukit Kuda
 Klinik Kesihatan Bukit Naga
 Klinik Kesihatan Kapar
 Klinik Kesihatan Meru
 Klinik Kesihatan Pandamaran
 Klinik Kesihatan Pelabuhan Klang
 Klinik Kesihatan Pulau Indah
 Klinik Kesihatan Pulau Ketam
 Klinik Kesihatan Rantau Panjang
 Klinik Kesihatan Sungai Bertik

Local landmarks and attractions

 Istana Alam Shah 
 The royal residence of the Sultan of Selangor was built in 1950 in south Klang to replace the old Mahkota Puri Palace. Parts of the Palace are accessible to the public but only on a few days of the week. 
 Near the Palace is the Klang Royal City Park (Taman Bandar Diraja Klang), and located in front of the Palace is a sports stadium (Stadium Padang Sultan Sulaiman) and the Royal Klang Club.
 Sultan Sulaiman Royal Mosque 
 The royal Mosque that was built in 1932 and features an eclectic architecture that combines Moorish, Western Art Deco and Neoclassical styles.
 Kuan Im Teng Klang (巴生观音亭, Goddess of Mercy Temple) 
 Kuan Im Teng (as pronounced in the Hokkien dialect) was established in 1892 and is over 100 years old. This Goddess of Mercy Temple is located at the Jalan Barat Daya, near Simpang Lima. Bustling with devotees during the first day and the fifteenth day of lunar calendar. It is one of the oldest temple in Malaya since colonial period, built by the Hokkien community.
 The temple is also involved in charity work, contributing to several health and educational organisations.  On the eve of Chinese New Year, the temple is opened all night and the street is often packed with devotees queuing shoulder to shoulder to enter the temple hall to offer their incense to the Kwan Yin in hope for an auspicious start to the New Year.

 Church of Our Lady of Lourdes (巴生露德圣母堂)
 A Catholic church built in 1928, the church celebrated its Golden Jubilee in 2008 after the church building had undergone restoration. Father Souhait played a large part in the design of the church building, modelling it on the pilgrimage church in Lourdes, France. 
 The design of the church follows the style of a Gothic architecture.
 Kota Raja Mahadi
 This historic fort was actually an arch of the fort. In the old days, there was a struggle between Raja Mahadi and Raja Abdullah for the control of the Klang district.
 Tugu Keris (Keris Monument)
 A memorial erected to commemorate the Silver Jubilee of the Sultan of Selangor's installation in 1985. The monument is specially designed to depict the Keris Semenanjung that symbolises power, strength and unity.
 Kai Hong Hoo Temple (开封府)
 The only temple in Malaysia dedicated to the worship of Bao Zheng (包公), who was a government officer in ancient China's Song Dynasty. Justice Bao consistently demonstrated extreme honesty and uprightness and is today respected as the cultural symbol of justice in the Chinese community worldwide.
 Tanjung Harapan (The Esplanade)
 Fronting the Straits of Malacca, the Esplanade is a sea-side family recreation spot near to North port that houses several seafood restaurants. Nice setup for sunset-gazing and also for anglers to fish.
 Little India (Klang)
 Colourful street from the striking saris hanging from shops to the snacks and sweetmeats on sale from shops and roadside stalls. During Deepavali, the Indian festival of lights, the street is astoundingly transformed into a colourful spectacle of lights and booming sound of music.
 Sri Sundararaja Perumal Temple
 Built in 1896, it is one of the oldest and the largest of the Vaishnavite temples in Malaysia. The temple is often referred to as the "Thirupathi of South East Asia" after its namesake in India.
 Sri Subramania Swamy Temple, Klang
 A Hindu temple devoted to the worship of Lord Murugan in Teluk Pulai, Klang that was established on 14 February 1914. It holds a unique distinction among the Hindu temples in Klang as it was founded and managed by the Ceylonese/Sri Lankan community who lived around the vicinity of the temple. Prayer rituals are done like those in Sri Lanka and certain festivals specific to the Ceylonese/Jaffnese community are celebrated here. The arasamaram or sacred fig tree which is in the temple was there since 1914 and is possibly one of the oldest living tree in Klang.
 Connaught Bridge
 One of the oldest bridges in Malaysia's Klang Valley region. It was built in 1948 by the British. The bridge is located in Jalan Dato' Mohd Sidin (Federal route) near Connaught Bridge Power Station in Klang Selangor.
 At one time, Connaught bridge can only be crossed one vehicle at a time. No lorry could pass it because it was limited to car, van and small vehicle only. The wooden bridge closed in 1993–1994. In 1995 the wooden bridge was replaced by a concrete box girder bridge.
 Kota Bridge
 The first and only double-decker bridge in Malaysia and South East Asia. The bottom deck is a pedestrian walkway bridge while the top deck is a motorist bridge. The bridge was closed to car traffic in the 1990s due to high demand that necessitated the construction of a new bridge.
 The new Jambatan Kota is located beside of the old bridge. The old bridge was constructed between 1957 and 1960, and was officially opened in 1961 by the late Sultan of Selangor, Almarhum Sultan Salahuddin Abdul Aziz Shah as part of the celebration of his coronation as the ninth Sultan of Selangor.
 Sultan Abdul Aziz Royal Gallery
 Is the royal gallery located at Bangunan Sultan Suleiman, Klang. Various collections depicting the reign of Sultan Salahuddin Abdul Aziz Shah; from his early childhood through his appointment as the eighth Sultan Selangor in 1960 and as the eleventh Yang di-Pertuan Agong in 1999.
 Klang Selatan Fire Station
 Is a Victorian-style structure that was built in 1890s. Today, the building still serves as a fire station. 
 Local firemen have taken the initiative to set up a mini gallery at the fire station in support of the Klang Heritage Walk.

Cuisine

 Malay food 
The most significant food spot in Klang is at "Emporium Makan", this old spot situated in the heart the city, opposite of Pasar Jawa and next to Jambatan Kota. One of the stalls is "Lontong Klang" and it serves dishes such as, lontong and nasi lemak sambal sotong. This spot is visited by all races, Malay, Chinese and Indian. As of now, the place has since been demolished to make way for the LRT 3 project. The vendors have relocated to various places around town. 

 Indian food 

Klang is incomplete without Indian restaurants because Klang has one of the best Indian restaurant in the state especially in the federal area, many Indian restaurants located in the Little India as the restaurants visited by not only Indians moreover by Malay and Chinese too. Banana leaf rice, Chicken and Mutton Briyani, Chicken Tandoori, Idiyappam, Idli and so on are the cuisine people craving for lunch and dinner can get easily in here. There are some Indians restaurants outside the Little India which are the places where Indians are highly populated.

 Chinese food 
Klang is known for its Bak Kut Teh, a non-halal herbal soup that uses pork ribs and tenderloins.  The dish is popularly thought to have originated in Klang. Bak Kut Teh is available in various locations including Taman Intan (previously called Taman Rashna), Teluk Pulai, Jalan Kereta Api and Pandamaran. The locals normally eat this food in the morning or afternoon, and you will hardly find this in the evening time.

There are a number of food courts in Klang which served local cuisine.  Located in Taman Eng Ann is a large food court serving many daytime snacks ranging from the well-known Chee Cheong Fun, Yong Tau Foo, Popia (Chinese springrolls), the medicinal herb Lin Zhi Kang'' drink, to Rojak and Cendol. Other stalls found also serving Chee Cheong Fun in Klang are located around the Meru Berjaya area. The Yong Tau Foo, a Malaysian Hakka Chinese delicacy, is a common meal for lunch and dinner as well.

Seafood
The coastal regions and islands near Port Klang are also known for their seafood, such as Pulau Ketam, Bagan Hailam, Teluk Gong, Pandamaran and Tanjung Harapan.

Climate 
Klang has a tropical monsoon climate with heavy rainfall year-round.

Education
Klang is also known as education hub where hundreds of national schools, private schools and colleges were built.

National Schools

Private Schools & Colleges 
 Acmar International & Private Schools
 Beaconhouse Sri Lethia Private School
 Regent International School
 Sanctus International School
 Sri KDU International School Klang
 Wesley Methodist School
 Zenith Private Schools
 Chung Hua Independent High School 中华独中
 Hin Hua High School 兴华独中
 Kwang Hua (Private) High School 光华独中
 Pin Hwa High School 滨华独中
 Klang Community College (Kolej Komuniti Klang)
 WIT College (Kolej WIT)
 Peninsula College (formerly known as ALC College)

Rehabilitation & Development 
This initiative ascertains the quality and opportunity of potential developments along the river. The project, undertaken by Landasan Lumayan Sdn. Bhd. (a subsidiary of MBI Selangor) will be highly beneficial to the economy of the state. The master plan set-up reserves Klang as an Eco Smart City to spur on new sustainable social and economic growth along Klang River that includes elements of river cleaning, rehabilitation & development. Sungai Klang will be turned into a new source of economy for the state through the Selangor Maritime Gateway (SMG) project. SMG includes several development components including commerce, hospitality, tourism, housing and service industry.

River Cleaning 
Landasan Lumayan Sdn Bhd (LLSB) has been given the mandate to clean the Klang River since 2016 crossing four municipalities namely MBPJ, MBSJ, MBSA and MPK. Due to the efforts given, a vast amount of total waste collected until July 2019 is around 50,000 MT. The debris has been reduced from average of 1,446 MT per month in 2016 to 1,094 MT per month in 2019. This enormous improvement is due to public awareness among the residents through various programs and activities organised under Selangor Maritime Gateway. Projects includes :

 Log Boom Installation
 Water Quality Live Monitoring Systems
 Interceptor

Rehabilitation 
Rehabilitation ensures the sustainability of the surrounding population and environment in a changing climate. The objectives are to restore ecological balance, to improve water quality to avoid flood mitigation as well as to preserve the environment for a better transformation of Klang River. The primary purpose of rehabilitation of Telok Kapas with 98 acres of land in Pasir Panjang, Klang which had been officially stopped in operation in 2007 is to improve water quality as well as restoring the site with a proper safe closure. The comprehensive rehabilitation of Klang River involves creation of new land and utility services with estimated cost of RM 3 billion that involve the Design Concept, Construction and Operation and Maintenance. The objectives are to increase the water quality and economic activities.

Development 
The framework sets to re-establish the urban developments along the river from one zone to the other. The plans set the development of six (6) zones in Selangor Maritime Gateway (SMG) through consolidation of Urban Design, Landscape, Transportation, Environmental and Economic Consideration of the existing condition and cultural context. Six zones are proposed as a basis for creating community identity and place-making along the river stretch. Together, the intention brings the true potential of what Klang River can be as well as gives a new pulse to the river. The catalyst projects includes :

 Pengkalan Batu Urban Park
 Mangrove Point
 Grand Bazaar
 Cultural Village & Retreat Resort
 Community River Park

Services 

River Patrol Unit (PRU) was established to monitor any illegal activities that may risk water quality and it has been commenced at certain routes along Klang River. Apart from the physical impact project, we have acted proactively by conducting continuous monitoring along the river reserves to ensure that no activity is at risk of polluting the Klang River. Therefore, the formation of the Motorcycle River Patrol Unit is required at this point with the assistance of existing government agencies such as LUAS, JPS, etc.

Looking at the rich historical value of the Klang River, providing connectivity via water for tourist destinations along the river which brought a huge impact to the earlier population in terms of economic activities and growth of the Klang Valley. The River Taxi will also help to attract the local and even international tourists to embrace the natural beauty of the Klang River and historic Klang town. The introduction of new tourist attractions such as Pangkalan Batu Urban Park and Biophilia concept at Mangrove Point in addition to the existing spots, will serve to complement the tourism industry in Klang which will attract locals, Klang Valley population and international tourists.

International relations

Sister cities

 Urumqi, Xinjiang,  China
 Yongzhou, Hunan, China

References

External links
 
 Klang Online Magazine,Guide & Map
 Official portal of Klang Municipal Council (MPK)